The 93rd Regiment Illinois Volunteer Infantry was an infantry regiment that served in the Union Army during the American Civil War.

Service
The 93rd Illinois Infantry was mustered into state service at Chicago, Illinois and mustered into Federal service on October 13, 1862.

The regiment was mustered out on June 23, 1865, and discharged at Chicago, Illinois, on July 7, 1865.

Total strength and casualties
The regiment suffered 4 officers and 147 enlisted men who were killed in action or who died of their wounds and 1 officer and 147 enlisted men who died of disease, for a total of 294 fatalities.

Commanders
Colonel Holden Putnam - killed November 25, 1863.

See also
List of Illinois Civil War Units
Illinois in the American Civil War

Notes

References
The Civil War Archive

Units and formations of the Union Army from Illinois
1862 establishments in Illinois
Military units and formations established in 1862
Military units and formations disestablished in 1865